The Holly King and Oak King are personifications of the winter and summer in various neopagan traditions. The two kings engage in endless "battle" reflecting the seasonal cycles of the year: not only solar light and dark, but also crop renewal and growth. During warm days of Midsummer the Oak King is at the height of his strength; the Holly King regains power at the Autumn equinox, then his strength peaks during Midwinter, at which point the Oak King is reborn, regaining power at the Spring equinox, and perpetuating the succession.

Interpretations
Robert Graves in The White Goddess identifies other legends and archetypes of paired hero-figures as the basis of the Holly/Oak King myth, including:
Lleu Llaw Gyffes and Gronw Pebr
Gwyn and Gwythyr
Lugh and Balor
Balan and Balin
Gawain and the Green Knight
Jesus and John the Baptist

Similar comparisons had been previously suggested by Sir James George Frazer in The Golden Bough in Chapter XXVIII, "The Killing of the Tree Spirit" in the section "The Battle of Summer and Winter". Frazer drew parallels between the folk-customs associated with May Day or the changing seasons in Scandinavian, Bavarian and Native American cultures, amongst others, in support of this theory. However the Divine King of Frazer was split into the kings of winter and summer in Graves' work.

Stewart and Janet Farrar characterize the Oak King ruling the waxing year and the Holly King ruling the waning year, and apply the interpretation to Wiccan seasonal rituals. According to Joanne Pearson, the Holly King is represented by holly and other evergreens, and personifies the dark half of the Wheel of the Year. The Holly King is also seen by some Neopagans as prehistoric forebear of the Father Christmas legend.

In culture and modern beliefs
The battle of light with dark is commonly played out in traditional folk dance and mummers plays across Britain such as Calan Mai in Wales, Mazey Day in Cornwall, and Jack in the Green traditions in England that typically include a ritual battle in some form.

Some adherents of Modern Paganism consider the two counterparts as dual aspects of the Horned God waging for the favour of the Goddess.

See also
Alban Arthan
Dying-and-rising deity
Green Man
Krampus
Ritual of oak and mistletoe
Seven Days in New Crete (1949)
Triple Goddess (Neopaganism)

References

European folklore
December